Riccardo Chiarello (born 9 October 1993) is an Italian footballer who plays as a midfielder for  side Cesena.

Club career
Chiarello was born in Arzignano, he started playing football at Chievo youth team. He made his fourth-tier debut in Trissino-Valdagno, before he signed to Lega Pro side Real Vicenza. He made his professional debut in the 2014–15 season, on 28 September 2014 against Renate, coming in as a substitute for Daniel Beccaro in the 70th minute. He played in ArzignanoChiampo and Giana Erminio, before he signed to Alessandria on 11 January 2019.

On 7 July 2022 he joined Cesena.

References

Sources
 
 

1993 births
Living people
People from Arzignano
Footballers from Veneto
Association football midfielders
Italian footballers
A.C. ChievoVerona players
A.C.D. Trissino-Valdagno players
Real Vicenza V.S. players
A.S. Giana Erminio players
U.S. Alessandria Calcio 1912 players
Cesena F.C. players
Serie B players
Serie C players
Serie D players
Sportspeople from the Province of Vicenza